"Love Rainbow" (stylized as Løve Rainbow) is a song recorded by Japanese boy band Arashi, for their tenth studio album, Beautiful World (2011). It was released as a CD single on 8 September 2010 under the record label J Storm. "Love Rainbow" was used as the theme song for member, Jun Matsumoto's starring drama Natsu no Koi wa Nijiiro ni Kagayaku.

"Love Rainbow" reached number one on the Oricon Singles Chart for the week ending 12 September 2010 with initial sales of 529,000 copies. Within the same month of release, it was certified Double Platinum for shipments of over 500,000 units. "Love Rainbow" was the seventh best-selling single of 2010.

Release
The single was released in two editions. A regular version and a limited edition. The regular edition contains the title track and the b-side, "Over", and instrumentals of both tracks. The limited edition contains the title track and "Over", and the music video and making-of video for the title track.

Track listing

Charts and certifications

Charts

Sales and certifications

References

External links
 Product information

2010 singles
Arashi songs
Billboard Japan Hot 100 number-one singles
Oricon Weekly number-one singles
Japanese television drama theme songs
2010 songs
J Storm singles